Centre for London is London's dedicated think tank. Based in the UK, it undertakes research and organises events aimed at developing new solutions to the capital's critical challenges. The Centre, which is politically independent, advocates for a fair and prosperous global city.

The Centre is a registered charity. It is funded by a mixture of public, private and third sector supporters.

About

History

Centre for London was founded in 2011 as a programme within Demos, a UK-based think tank. In 2013, the Centre was launched as an independent registered charity.

The Centre's current research is organised around four core priorities:

• Promoting skills, opportunity and good work;

• Meeting housing needs and building better neighbourhoods;

• Tackling congestion and pollution, and creating more liveable roads and
streets;

• Strengthening relations with the rest of the UK.

Board

The Centre's chair of trustees is Liz Peace, Chairman of the Old Oak and Park Royal Development Corporation. Other trustees include Ben Page, Chief Executive of Ipsos Mori and Mark Boleat, Deputy Chairman of the City of London Corporation's Policy and Resources Committee.

Senior leadership

Centre for London was founded by Ben Rogers, a writer on philosophy and history, former Cabinet Office strategist and member of the London Finance Commission. Rogers writes regularly for the Evening Standard, Financial Times and other papers. Richard Brown joined the Centre as Research Director from the London Legacy Development Corporation in 2014.

Activities

Over the last seven years Centre for London has published over 50 policy reports, hosted over 100 public events, five major hustings and seven high-level conferences.

Skills and Work

The Centre has published several reports on good work, skills and the digital economy. In 2013, it published an influential report by Kitty Usher, arguing that the Mayor of London should be given the power to set a statutory minimum wage for the capital. A 2014 report by Charles Leadbeater coined the term "Endies" (short for Employed with No Disposable Income or Savings) in describing the large percentage of Londoners in work but struggling with the capital's high cost of living.

The Centre has also been known for its work on East London's digital economy, including A Tale of Tech City  the first independent report on the East London digital cluster, —and Connecting Tech City, an initiative aimed at connecting local young people and London's digital firms. It also set up a digital platform -wearedotdotdot— that allows young people to find digital skills programmes and training opportunities in Tech City. In 2016, the Centre put forward recommendations for how the Mayor of London could support digital growth and innovation, including to introduce a Chief Digital Officer, which Sadiq Khan committed to appointing on his election.

More recently in 2018, the Centre published Human Capital, a report produced in association with Ernst & Young, which suggested that almost a third of London's jobs have high potential for automation. It found that London's economy and workers are well-placed to adapt but called on policymakers to think radically about their response to workforce change.

Housing

Much of Centre for London's work has focused on housing and the built environment. This includes two influential reports  published in 2014 looking at the role of the Thames Estuary in meeting London's housing needs.

Ahead of the 2016 London Mayoral Election, the Centre revealed how the housing crisis had changed the face of poverty and inequality in the capital. It also set out an ambitious reform agenda to transform south London's railway network. In recent years, its research has also focussed on estate densification, the barriers preventing councils from house building and the development opportunities at London's stations.

Transport and Pollution

In 2017, Centre for London convened an independent, expert commission to examine how London can best manage the conflicting pressures on its roads and streets, and tackle the problems of congestion, pollution, affordability and road safety. The Commission was chaired by Sir Malcolm Grant CBE, Chair of NHS England and was made up of senior experts, including Frank Kelly, Professor of Environmental Health, King's College London and Peter Jones OBE, Professor of Transport and Sustainable Development, University College London. Their final report, Street Smarts was published in October 2017 and was welcomed by Deputy Mayor of London for Transport, Val Shawcross.

Global Capital

In 2015 Centre for London collaborated with The Global Cities Initiative  —a joint project of the Brookings Institution and JPMorgan Chase—on a number of events and publications, including Nations and the Wealth of Cities, by Greg Clark and the Rt Hon. Greg Clark MP.

Following the EU referendum result in 2016, Centre for London published Open City in July 2017, which considered the challenges that Brexit poses for London's position as a global city and set out the most urgent areas for action. The Centre coordinated an open letter to Rt Hon David Davis MP to mark the report's launch, including signatories such as Lord Andrew Adonis, Sadiq Khan, Chuka Umunna MP and Helen Hayes. It continues its work to help London maintain its international prominence while also strengthening relations with the rest of the UK.

Other
In 2015, Centre for London launched a quarterly journal entitled London Essays which was published nine times until its final edition in December 2017. In this year, the Centre launched a new digital publication, The London Intelligence, a quarterly analysis of the latest data on London under five major themes: demography, economy, infrastructure and housing, society and health and environment.

Events

Centre for London hosts an annual Conference - The London Conference -  - which has established itself as a significant event in London's political calendar - the one time in the year when leading Londoners come together to talk about the future of the capital. Boris Johnson, former Mayor of London, has spoken at the Conference three times, with other speakers including Lord Peter Mandelson, David Miliband, Sadiq Khan and Benjamin Barber.

See also

 List of think tanks in the United Kingdom

References

External links
 
 London Essays

Political and economic think tanks based in the United Kingdom
Think tanks established in 2011